Kalabhavan Rahman is a Malayalam film actor in Kerala.

Career
Rahman  started his film acting career in 1986 with a unimportant  role.  Reghunath Paleri directed the title Onnu Muthal Poojyam Vare. He hails  from Aluva in Kerala. Rahman is alumnus of U.C.College, Aluva.
He currently resides at Ernakulam and is married to Rejula Rahman. The couple has two kids, Fahim Rahman and Thanvi Rahman. He is active in the malayalam film industry for the last 30 years. He is an alumnus of Cochin Kalabhavan. Rahman was one among the creator associates of the Kalabhavan mimicry troop along with Siddique, Lal, Anzar, K.S. Prasad and Varkichan, among others.

Filmography

Film

References

External links

1965 births
Male actors from Kerala
Male actors in Malayalam cinema
Male actors in Malayalam television
Indian impressionists (entertainers)
Living people